2,α-Dimethyltryptamine (2,α-DMT) is a tryptamine and a lesser-known psychedelic drug. It is the 2,α-dimethyl analog of DMT. Its synthesis was first reported in 1965. Alexander Shulgin lists the dosage as 300-500 mg, and the duration as 7–10 hours in his book TiHKAL (Tryptamines I Have Known and Loved). 2,α-DMT causes mydriasis and paresthesia. It also produces a calm, drunk-like feeling. Very little data exists about the pharmacological properties, metabolism, and toxicity of 2,α-DMT.

References

External links
 2,a-DMT Entry in TIHKAL
 2,α-DMT Entry in TiHKAL • info

Psychedelic tryptamines